Sandy Lee (born 1964) is a South Korean-born-Canadian lawyer and politician, who was a member of the Legislative Assembly of the Northwest Territories from 1999 to 2011.

Political career

Territorial Assembly
Lee was elected to the legislature for the first time in the 1999 Northwest Territories general election, defeating future MLA Dave Ramsay and another candidate. She was re-elected to her second term in office in the 2003 Northwest Territories general election, winning with a landslide 80 per cent of the vote. Lee was the Minister for Health and Social Services, Status of Women and Disabilities.

2011 federal election
On March 26, 2011, Lee resigned as MLA so she could run in the 2011 federal election for the Conservatives in the Western Arctic. Lee was appointed by the executive of the territorial Conservative association. Her appointment caused upset among some of the regular members of the association. An advert in the 25 March 2011 Yellowknifer had stated that nominations would close at 5:00 pm that day, which the national party said was not a valid closure. Nomination papers for John Pollard were received after that and the territorial executive said his nomination was not valid.

She did not win election to the House of Commons of Canada, losing to incumbent MP Dennis Bevington.

References

1964 births
Canadian politicians of Korean descent
South Korean emigrants to Canada
Members of the Legislative Assembly of the Northwest Territories
Living people
Women MLAs in the Northwest Territories 
People from Yellowknife
Conservative Party of Canada candidates for the Canadian House of Commons
21st-century Canadian women politicians